Sugar Rush may refer to:

Film, television and literature

 Sugar Rush (2019 film), a Nigerian crime action comedy film
 Sugar Rush (novel), a 2004 novel by Julie Burchill
 Sugar Rush (British TV series), a 2005–2006 British comedy drama series
 Sugar Rush (2005 TV series), an American cooking program
 Sugar Rush (2018 TV series), an American baking reality show
 "Sugar Rush", a season 3 episode of Regular Show

Music 
 Sugar Rush (album), by The Humans, 2011
 Sugar Rush (Nic Cester album), 2017
 "Sugar Rush" (AKB48 song), 2012
 "Sugar Rush" (A-Teens song), 2001
 also released by Dream Street from the 2001 album Dream Street
 "Sugar Rush", a 2013 EP by Virtual Riot
 "Sugar Rush", a song by Cash Cash from the 2008 album Take It to the Floor
 "Sugar Rush", a song by Joy Electric from the 1997 album Robot Rock

Video games
 Sugar Rush (video game), a cancelled fighting game by Klei Entertainment
 Sugar Rush, a fictional kart-racing game in the Wreck-It Ralph franchise

See also 

Sugar#Hyperactivity